The Chemin de Fer Moudania Brousse, (English:Mudanya Bursa Railway), (Turkish:Mudanya Bursa Demiryolu), or CFMB was a  long railway line from the port of Mudanya to Bursa.

History
On August 14, 1871, the Ottoman Government started to build a line from the port city of Mudanya to the inland city of Bursa. During construction, the line was sold to two French investors in 1874. The railway reached Bursa and was finished in 1875. The railway was to be continued to Bozüyük where it would connect with the CFOA line, but the tracks were never laid. On January 2, 1891 Georges Nagelmackers paid £27,000 for the rail line. In 1932 the Turkish State Railways (TCDD) bought the line. The railway was not very profitable, so in 1948, TCDD abandoned the line.

Bursaray

The Bursaray light rail system started operating in 2002 as an urban transit option. Although one of its lines follow approximately the same route, Bursaray does not go as far as Mudanya.

See also
Bursaray
TCDD

References

External links
CFMB Trains of Turkey Page

Railway lines in Turkey
Railway lines opened in 1871
Railway lines closed in 1948
Ottoman railways
Metre gauge railways in Turkey
Closed railway lines in Turkey